Congress (aka Old Congress) is a census-designated place (CDP) in Yavapai County, Arizona, United States. Once a gold-mining center for the Congress Mine and then a ghost town, Congress now serves as a retirement and bedroom community for nearby Wickenburg. The population was 1,811 at the 2020 census.

History
Gold was discovered at the Congress Mine in 1884. By 1893, the Santa Fe, Prescott and Phoenix Railway passed within three miles of the mine, at Congress Junction. Congress boomed, and remained prosperous until the mid-1930s, when the mines closed. Total gold production at the Congress Mine exceeded $8 million, at the then-current price of $20.67 per ounce – or about $400 million, at the 2007 price.

The post office moved to Congress Junction in 1938, where it remains. The community now known as Congress is the old Congress Junction. Little remains at the original mining-camp townsite. The old Congress Cemetery is nearby.

Geography
Congress is located at  (34.146068, -112.846533).

Climate
According to the Köppen Climate Classification system, Congress has a semi-arid climate, abbreviated "BSk" on climate maps.

Demographics

At the 2020 census, there were 1,811 people and 801 households residing in Congress. The population density was 47.9 per square mile. There were 1,166 housing units at an average density of 30.9 per square mile.

The racial makeup of the CDP was 86.7% White, 1.4% Native American, 0.7% Asian, 0.6% Black or African American, 3.8% from other races, and 6.6% from two or more races.  9.4% of the population were Hispanic or Latino of any race.

There were 801 households, of which 11.5% had children under the age of 18 living with them, 68.2% were married couples living together, 17.9% had a male householder with no spouse present, 14.0% had a female householder with no spouse present. The average household size was 2.09 and the average family size was 2.57.

13.3% of the population were under the age of 18, 3.6% from 18 to 24, 13.3% from 25 to 44, 32.1% from 45 to 64, and 37.6% who were 65 years of age or older. The median age was 68.3 years.

The median household income was $48,080 and the median family income was $57,675. About 9.8% of the population were below the poverty line, including 19.4% of those under age 18 and 6.4% of those age 65 or over. The employment rate was 24.4%, and 12.7% of residents had a bachelor's degree or higher.

Education
Congress Elementary School District operates a local K-8 school. The district sends high school students to Wickenburg High School of the Wickenburg Unified School District. Students attended Wickenburg USD for all grade levels prior to 2001, when the Congress K-8 facility opened.

Government and infrastructure
The Congress Post Office, of the United States Postal Service, opened in 2001.

Gallery

See also

 Date Creek Mountains
 Stanton, Arizona
 Little Miss Nobody case – Sharon Lee Gallegos (1955–1960) whose murdered body was found in Congress

References

External links
 
 Congress ghost town, includes photo gallery

Census-designated places in Yavapai County, Arizona
Ghost towns in Arizona
Cemeteries in Arizona
Gold mines in the United States
Mining communities in Arizona